Petiville is the name of several communes in France:

Petiville, Calvados
Petiville, Seine-Maritime